Shriya Sharma (born 1997) is an Indian actress, model and advocate who has worked in Hindi, Tamil and Telugu films. She is known for playing the role of Sneha Bajaj in the television series Kasautti Zindagi Kay which won her the Star Pariwar and Indian Telly Awards for Best Child Artist. She was awarded the National Film Award for the Best Child Artist for Chillar Party (2011).

Personal life
Shriya Sharma was born in 1997, in the city of Palampur, Himachal Pradesh in India. Her father is an engineer and her mother is a dietician and runs a diet clinic - Ritus Diet. She is a graduate in law and is currently practicing as an advocate. She also has a younger brother.

Filmography

Films

Television
 Kanhaiya
 Kasautii Zindagii Kay as Sneha Bajaj/Gill (2004-2005)
 Jhoot Bole Kawya Katte as Shriya
 Carryy on Shekhar
 Galaxy of Stars
 Gumrah: End of Innocence (Season 3 - Episode 3)
 Confessions of an Indian Teenager
 Pogo Awards (2006 and 2007)
 Kya Aap Paanchvi Pass Se Tez Hain? as herself with Shah Rukh Khan (2008)
 Boogie Woogie as Jury member (2008)
 LIL STAR Awards (2008)
 Stories by Rabindranath Tagore as Ameena (Episode 26 - Dalia) (2015)

Other works
Shriya has reportedly done over 150 advertisements in Hindi, English, Tamil, Malayalam, Telugu, Kanada and Bengali languages for brands like - Complan, Asian Paints, Red Label Tea, Pears Soap, Santoor Soap, Colgate, Chennai Silks, Pothys, Sarvana Stores, Sunfeast Pasta Treat, Lux Cozi, Whirlpool among others. She has also featured in Punjabi music videos and has done dance stage performances for ETV in 2017.

Awards 
 Indian Telly Award for Best Child Artiste - Female for Kasautii Zindagii Kay.
 National Film Award for the Best Child Artist for Chillar Party.

References

External links

1997 births
Living people
21st-century Indian child actresses
Actresses in Telugu cinema
Indian film actresses
Actresses in Tamil cinema
Actresses in Kannada cinema
Actresses in Hindi cinema
People from Kangra district
Actresses from Himachal Pradesh
Actresses in Hindi television
Indian television actresses
21st-century Indian actresses
Best Child Artist National Film Award winners